Thérèse-De Blainville is a federal electoral district in Quebec.

Thérèse-De Blainville was created by the 2012 federal electoral boundaries redistribution and was legally defined in the 2013 representation order. It came into effect upon the call of the 42nd Canadian federal election, scheduled for 19 October 2015. The riding was created from parts of Terrebonne—Blainville (51%) and Marc-Aurèle-Fortin (49%).

The riding was originally intended to be named Blainville.

Members of Parliament

This riding has elected the following Members of Parliament:

Election results

References

Quebec federal electoral districts
Blainville, Quebec
Sainte-Thérèse, Quebec